This is a list of notable polling organizations by country. All the major television networks, alone or in conjunction with the largest newspapers or magazines, in virtually every country with elections, operate their own versions of polling operations, in collaboration or independently through various applications.

Several organizations try to monitor the behavior of polling firms and the use of polling and statistical data, including the Pew Research Center and, in Canada, the Laurier Institute for the Study of Public Opinion and Policy.

Australia
AC Nielsen Polling – formerly published in Fairfax newspapers, withdrawn in 2014
Essential Media Communications – formerly published on Crikey website, now in Guardian Australia
Galaxy Research – now part of YouGov
Ipsos Australia – published in Nine Entertainment's former Fairfax newspapers, The Sydney Morning Herald, The Age and the Australian Financial Review, but withdrew from political polling after an unpredicted result in the 2019 election, although continues the relationship with other polls 
Newspoll – published in News Limited's The Australian newspaper
ReachTEL – used by Nine Entertainment for single-seat and state election polling
Roy Morgan Research – published online and given away
UComms, which has links to unions ACTU and CFMMEU – formerly used by Fairfax, then by Nine Entertainment for single-seat and state elections
YouGov – published in News Limited's Weekly Times

Brazil
IBOPE (Instituto Brasileiro de Opinião Pública e Estatística) which acronym has become the Brazilian household word for TV audience rating and a slang word that indicates that a meeting or similar function had significant attendance.
OPUS Research

Canada
Abacus Data
EKOS Research Associates
Environics Research Group
Forum Research
Ipsos-Reid
Léger Marketing
Mainstreet Research
Pollara

France
 Harris Insights & Analytics
 Institut français d'opinion publique
 Ipsos
 Kantar TNS
 Médiamétrie
 
 OpinionWay
 CSA
 Odoxa
 Elabe

Germany
Allensbach Institute
Forsa institute
Infratest dimap

Iran
Ayandeh – closed in 2002 and director Abbas Abdi arrested

Mexico
Ipsos
Rubrum

New Zealand
Colmar Brunton

Philippines
Pulse Asia
Social Weather Stations

Ukraine
Kyiv International Institute of Sociology
Rating Group Ukraine
Razumkov Centre A policy think tank also widely published throughout Ukraine
Research & Branding Group, widely published throughout Ukraine and Internationally. Works include exit polls and regular surveys of the public's political opinions

United Kingdom
ComRes, retained pollster for the BBC and The Independent
ICM
Ipsos MORI (formerly MORI)
Populus, official The Times pollster
Qriously
Survation, pollster to The Mail on Sunday, Daily Mirror, Daily Record and Sky News
Kantar Group
YouGov

United States
Statistician Nate Silver of FiveThirtyEight maintains a list of pollsters who conduct surveys in U.S. political elections and assigns each pollster a rating based on its methodology and historical accuracy. Silver also lists the number of polls analyzed for each pollster.
Elway Research
Emerson College Polling
Field Research Corporation (Field Poll) – see Mervin Field
Franklin Pierce University Polling
Gallup Poll
Harris Insights & Analytics
Ipsos
Marist Institute for Public Opinion 
Monmouth University Polling Institute
Morning Consult
NORC at the University of Chicago (formerly the National Opinion Research Center)
Nielsen ratings
Pew Research Center
The Phillips Academy Poll (Andover Poll)
Public Policy Institute of California
Public Policy Polling
Quinnipiac University Polling Institute
Rasmussen Reports
Research 2000 (defunct)
Siena Research Institute at Siena College
St. Norbert College Strategic Research Institute (Wisconsin Survey)
Suffolk University Political Research Center (SUPRC)
SurveyMonkey
SurveyUSA
Susquehanna Polling & Research
Trafalgar Group
University of Massachusetts Lowell Center for Public Opinion
University of New Hampshire Survey Center (Granite State Poll)
YouGov
Zogby International

References

Polling
Public opinion